The Republic SD-4 Swallow was an early high-speed reconnaissance drone developed by Republic Aviation for the United States Army. Intended for use by the U.S. Army Signal Corps to target tactical ballistic missiles, it was cancelled before the first prototype could be completed, and did not see operational service.

Design and development
Contracts were awarded by the U.S. Army in 1960 for development of a high-speed, long-range reconnaissance drone to provide targeting information to the Army's tactical ballistic missile force; competing designs for the requirement were developed by Republic Aviation, which proposed a 'clean-sheet' aircraft given the designation SD-4 Swallow, and Fairchild Aircraft, which developed a variant of the Bull Goose decoy missile as the SD-5 Osprey.

Given the full designation AN/USD-4 for its overall system, the SD-4 was of tailless delta configuration, with power provided by a Pratt & Whitney J60 turbojet, the military version of the civilian JT12 engine; two Arrow 2 jet-assisted takeoff-type rocket boosters allowing for zero length launch from a specially-designed trailer.  

In a similar fashion to Republic's smaller SD-3 drone, the Swallow was equipped with an interchangeable nose section allowing for aerial photography, infrared photography, or radar systems to be installed depending on mission needs. Capable of operating in any weather conditions, recovery following the completion of the SD-4's mission was to be by parachute. 

Before any flight test vehicles were constructed, the program was cancelled in January of 1961 due to cost constraints.

Specifications

See also

References
Citations

Bibliography

 

 
 

SD-4
Cancelled military aircraft projects of the United States
Mid-wing aircraft
Single-engined jet aircraft
Delta-wing aircraft
Unmanned military aircraft of the United States